Anton Kuznetsov (born ) is a Kazakhstani male volleyball player. He is part of the Kazakhstan men's national volleyball team. On club level he plays for Kondensat-Zhaikmunay.

References

External links
 profile at FIVB.org

1989 births
Living people
Kazakhstani men's volleyball players
Place of birth missing (living people)
Volleyball players at the 2014 Asian Games
Asian Games competitors for Kazakhstan
Volleyball players at the 2018 Asian Games
21st-century Kazakhstani people